Mesochernes elegans is a species of pseudoscorpions in the family Chernetidae. It is found in Venezuela.

References

External links 
 
 Mesochernes elegans at Western Australian Museum

Chernetidae
Animals described in 1892
Invertebrates of Venezuela